Tumu is a small town and is the capital of Sissala East district, a district in the Upper West Region of north Ghana, adjacent to the border with Burkina Faso. Tumu is connected by road to the town of Navrongo.

Tumu is the nearest town to Gbele Resource Centre, the fourth largest reserve in Ghana.

References

Populated places in Sissala East Municipal District